Five Six Seven Eight, also known as 5678, is an Indian Tamil-language teen dance drama series directed by A. L. Vijay, Prasanna JK, and Mrudhula Sridharan and produced by A.L. Alagappan and Hitesh Thakkur, starring Ditya Bhande, Nagendra Prasad, Chinni Prakash, Vivek Jogdande, Meetha Raghunath, Sree Ram, among others. The series follows the lives of middle-class youngsters who are gifted dancers but are financially disadvantaged. Despite the difficulties they are facing in life, they work hard to achieve their dreams. The series will premiere on ZEE5 on November 18, 2022.

Cast 

 Ditya Bhande as Semba 
 Nagendra Prasad
 Chinni Prakash
 Vivek Jogdande as Viky
 Meetha Raghunath
 Sree Raam
 Shreya
 Hunar Sharma
 Prajna Ravi
 Sai Pallavi
 Vidyuth Vivek
 Mona Kakade 
 Akshat Singh

Release 
In early 2022, ZEE5 announced a slate of eleven upcoming Tamil series and films, with Five Six Seven Eight being one of them, scheduled for a release on November 18, 2022. The makers unveiled the first look posters through social media platforms and the official teaser was released on October 17 2022 which shows a conflict of sorts between two dance groups who come from different socio-economic backgrounds.

Reception 
A critic from Cinema Express wrote that "As a whole, the Five Six Seven Eight series has its heart in the right place".

References

External links 
 
 Five Six Seven Eight on ZEE5

ZEE5 original programming
Tamil-language web series
Tamil-language teen television series
2022 Tamil-language television series debuts